Graciano San Francisco is a Honduran football club based in Gracias, Honduras.

History
They took over the San Antonio de San Marcos de Ocotepeque franchise to play in the Honduran second division from the 2013 Clausura.

References

Football clubs in Honduras